The 1983–84 Boise State Broncos men's basketball team represented Boise State University during the 1983–84 NCAA Division I men's basketball season. The Broncos were led by first-year head coach Bobby Dye and played their home games on campus at the BSU Pavilion in Boise, Idaho.

Boise State met third seed Montana State in Bozeman and lost by a point.
  
Dye was hired in late March, after two years at Cal State Bakersfield.  Winless in the season prior to his arrival, he led the Roadrunners to the Division II Final Four in 1983.  He had earlier led Cal State Fullerton for seven years.

Senior swingman Vince Hinchen was named to the all-conference team and junior guard Frank Jackson was honorable mention. Hinchen was an honorable mention Associated Press All-American, and a fifth-round selection (96th overall) of the Cleveland Cavaliers in the 1984 NBA draft.

Postseason results

|-
!colspan=6 style=| Big Sky tournament

References

External links
Sports Reference – Boise State Broncos – 1983–84 basketball season

Boise State Broncos men's basketball seasons
Boise State
Boise State